Nicholas Franklin Roberts (October 13, 1849 - June 25, 1934) was a leading Baptist minister and educator in Raleigh, North Carolina. He was a faculty member and for a short time acting president at Shaw University. He also was a city alderman in Raleigh and served on the county board of education.

Early life and education 
Nicholas Franklin Roberts was born in Seaboard, Northhampton County, North Carolina on October 13, 1849. As a child, he worked on a farm. He showed aptitude for mathematics at a young age and entered Shaw University (then Shaw Collegiate Institute) on October 10, 1871. He graduated in May, 1878 and was then hired as professor of Mathematics at Shaw.

Roberts was active in Republican politics, even as a student, serving as secretary of a Republican county meeting in July 1872. Along with Shaw University president, Henry Martin Tupper, and fellow student, Edward Hart Lipscomb, Roberts was an editor of the quarterly journal, African Expositor, founded in 1878 and was later the business manager of the Baptist Sentinel.

Baptist church service 
In March 1872 he converted to the Baptist religion and on May 20, 1877 was ordained a minister. On July 2, 1882, he was made pastor of Blount Street Baptist Church in Raleigh, North Carolina. From 1873 to 1883 he was president of the State Sunday School convention a position he served in many times. He also was elected president of the State Baptist Convention numerous times, first in October 1885. He was made general missionary among North Carolina poor by the American Baptist Home Mission Society in 1881. He resigned as pastor of the Blount Street Baptist Church in August 1891 to focus on his other activities.

Public service 

Roberts was heavily involved in political, educational, and religious organizations and served as an officer of many bodies. He was vice president of the state Colored Education Convention in 1877. In 1886, he was an alderman in Raleigh and a member of the street committee. He was elected to the county school board in 1897. He also led the Institute for Colored Teachers in the early 1900s.

In late 1897 and early 1898, Roberts hosted South African tribal nobility, grandson of Chief Kama (also called King Kama) of Kaffraria and nephew of Chief William Shaw Kama, Alfred Impey, as Alfred attended Shaw University. However, Impey died of consumption in North Carolina in April 1898.

Shaw served as acting head of Shaw University for five months after Tupper died on November 12, 1893, serving from that date until March 14, 1894. He later held positions of vice-president dean of faculty, and dean of the theology department.

Personal life and death 
He married Mary S. Chavis of Union, North Carolina in 1904. He died June 25, 1934.

References

1849 births
1934 deaths
People from Seaboard, North Carolina
African-American Baptist ministers
Baptist ministers from the United States
19th-century American mathematicians
19th-century Presbyterian ministers
Politicians from Raleigh, North Carolina
Shaw University alumni
African-American journalists
American male journalists
African-American mathematicians
Baptists from North Carolina
Raleigh City Council members
School board members in North Carolina